Put-in-Bay is a resort village located on South Bass Island in Put-in-Bay Township, Ottawa County, Ohio, United States,  east of Toledo. The population was 154 at the 2020 census.

The village is a popular summer resort and recreational destination. Ferry and airline services connect the community with Catawba Island, Kelleys Island, Port Clinton, and Sandusky, Ohio.

The bay played a significant role in the War of 1812 as the location of the squadron of U.S. naval commander Oliver Hazard Perry, who sailed from the port on September 10, 1813, to engage a British squadron just north of the island in the Battle of Lake Erie.

Location and area

History 
The first known people to use the island were various groups of Native American tribes, including the Ottawas, Miamis, Shawnee, Senecas, Iroquois, and the Eries. The island provided shelter during crossings of Lake Erie. Some remains were discovered when a section of the island was plowed.

In 1679, Robert LaSalle and thirty-two of his men were the first to sail a large vessel in the Great Lakes: the Griffon. They would transport fur and pelts from Green Bay, Wisconsin to Queensland, Ontario. Stopping at Middle Bass Island, they found unique undiscovered flowers. They named the island Isle des Fleurs because of the flowers; this name was used for the next 200 years.

During the War of 1812, Put-in-Bay was an important base of operations for the US Navy fleet commanded by Oliver Hazard Perry. Perry and his fleet arrived at the island on August 16, 1813. They used the island to train and to spy on the British, who were located at Fort Malden, Ontario, Canada. At that point, the war had been going on for 32 months and developments had favored the British: Detroit had surrendered to them, and all American invasions of Canada had been repulsed. On September 10, 1813, Captain Robert H. Barclay, the commander of the British ships, was seen by a lookout on Perry's flagship, the Lawrence. Perry and his fleet hid behind the Bass Islands and waited for the British to unknowingly cross their path. The battle began at 11:45 in the morning about eight miles away from Put-in-Bay, with the British fleet caught by surprise. By around 3:00 of that day Perry and his fleet had defeated the British, who lost control of Lake Erie along with their entire fleet of six ships. This event was a major turning point in the war.

Two iconic American Navy slogans originated from these events: "Don't Give Up The Ship" and "We have met the enemy and they are ours.".

Between 1820 and 1830 the island was under the jurisdiction of Huron County, Ohio, but it was later joined to Ottawa County, Ohio. Put-in-Bay Township was established after 1830. The island was only sparsely inhabited and there was no actual village prior to the creation of the township. The first known white resident of the island was Alexander Ewen, who had about 1,000 hogs roaming the island in 1810.

The abolitionist John Brown's son John Jr. lived in Put-In-Bay, "growing grapes for the Chicago market", from 1862 until his death in 1895. His brother Owen also lived there before moving to Pasadena, California.

Memorial 
Put-in-Bay is the site of Perry's Victory and International Peace Memorial commemorating Commodore Oliver Hazard Perry's September 10, 1813, naval victory over British ships in the War of 1812. Construction of the monument began in 1912 and it opened to the public on June 13, 1915. It is 352 feet (107 m) tall and made up of 78 layers of pink granite, topped with an eleven ton (10 metric ton) bronze urn. Its height makes it the highest open-air observatory operated by the U.S. National Park Service. The remains of six naval officers, three British and three Americans, were interred beneath the floor of the monument's rotunda.

Demographics

2010 Census 
As of the census of 2010, there were 138 people, 70 households, and 43 families residing in the village. The racial makeup of the village was 100.0% White.

There were 70 households, of which 17.1% had children under the age of 18 living with them, 52.9% were married couples living together, 4.3% had a female householder with no husband present, 4.3% had a male householder with no wife present, and 38.6% were non-families. 32.9% of all households were made up of individuals, and 10% had someone living alone who was 65 years of age or older. The average household size was 1.94 and the average family size was 2.44.

The median age in the village was 54.7 years. 15.2% of residents were under the age of 18; 2.2% were between the ages of 18 and 24; 15.1% were from 25 to 44; 38.4% were from 45 to 64; and 29% were 65 years of age or older. The gender makeup of the village was 52.9% male and 47.1% female.

Education
The village is home to Put-in-Bay High School. Aside from South Bass Island, Put-In-Bay Local School District covers the Lake Erie Islands of Buckeye Island, Gibraltar Island, Green Island, Mouse Island, Rattlesnake Island, and Starve Island, even though most of these islands are uninhabited.

Climate

Transportation

Ohio state routes

Airports

 Put-in-Bay Airport offers a single, unlit, paved 2870-foot runway in addition to a helipad.
 North Bass Island Airport located on North Bass Island, offers a  (549.9 m) paved airstrip.

Tourism

For most of its history, the island's primary industry has been tourism and continues to be today. The tourist season runs roughly between April and October. The most common methods of transportation to and from the island are via ferry boat, propeller-driven aircraft and private boat.

One of the world's largest hotels, the Hotel Victory, opened its 625 rooms to the public in 1892. The four-story hotel featured a one-thousand-seat dining room. However, on August 14, 1919, the giant hotel burned to the ground. Today only parts of the foundations can be seen at the state campground.

Other historical sites include:

 Stonehenge Estate – An estate with 19th-century buildings that are listed on the National Register of Historic Places.
 Perry's Cave – Cave discovered by Native Americans. Perry sent men here during the War of 1812 (Battle of Lake Erie). Has an underground lake from which Perry's men obtained drinking water, after previously drinking from the bacteria filled Lake Erie water and getting sick. The water in the cave was clean and thus by drinking it, his men returned to health in order to win the battle.
 Heineman's winery and Crystal Cave – the world's largest geode.
 Lake Erie Islands Historical Society – 6,000 square foot (560 m2) museum that houses artifacts, memorabilia and genealogical data pertinent to the Lake Erie Islands.

There are under 150 full-time South Bass Island residents, most of whom remain on the island over the winter. Supplies and perishables are flown to the island during the winter months along with the mail, parcels, and bank employees who staff the island's only bank (for one day a week) until the spring. The island has a single school that is used for grades kindergarten through 12 and serves the educational requirements of Middle Bass and North Bass islands as well. These students arrive by plane, boat, or ATV across the frozen lake, depending on the season and weather.

Put-in-Bay has one grocery store, one hardware store, one school—which houses the one lending library branch—one gas station, a post office, one bank, and two cemeteries. It has one seasonal franchise restaurant, Subway. There is no cinema. The island does not have a hospital, but does have an Emergency Medical Service that can use a Life Flight helicopter to transport critically ill patients to mainland medical facilities.

In 1952–1959, as well as 1963, the island held road races around a  course. In 2011, the Put-in-Bay Road Races Reunion returned to the island. The temporary road course set up at the Put-in-Bay Airport during the event was a key step in pointing the way to the return of real vintage sports car racing to the island for 2012.

The Boy Scouts of America hold an annual camporee at the base of Perry's Monument.

Gallery

See also

 Populated islands of the Great Lakes

Notes

References

External links

 

Villages in Ottawa County, Ohio
Villages in Ohio
Ohio populated places on Lake Erie